The Reader is an alternative newspaper in Omaha, Nebraska, USA.

History 
The Reader was established in 1994 by a group that included John Heaston and Dan Beckmann. Beckmann bought out Heaston in 1999, then sold nearly all of his ownership interest in February 2000 to 77-year-old Alan Baer, a member of the family that had founded the J. L. Brandeis and Sons department store chain. Baer replaced Beckmann as publisher a few months later.

Meanwhile, Heaston established another paper, the Omaha Weekly, in March 2000. After Baer died in November 2002, Heaston bought the Reader and merged it with the Weekly.  John Heaston was interviewed in 2021 about the Reader's history as part of the paper's recent membership drive on a biweekly podcast "Reader Radio."

The Reader'''s corporate owner, Pioneer Publishing, also publishes several other papers and websites, including the Spanish language El Perico.    

In January 2015, The Reader changed its publication frequency from weekly to monthly and increased daily content on The Reader's website.The Reader'' was published out of a train car that was attached to a brewery on 78th and Cass (1995) before it enjoyed stints at offices downtown (1996-1999) and in historic Dundee (2000-2007) until landing in its current location in the immigrant hub that is South Omaha near the intersection of 27th and L Streets.

Current 
In 2022, The Reader was named as one of "10 news publishers who do it right" by Editor & Publisher Magazine. The 2022 masthead includes Publisher John Heaston, Lead News reporter Chris Bowling,

References

External links
 

Alternative weekly newspapers published in the United States
Newspapers published in Omaha, Nebraska
Publications established in 1984